Mahmoud Toba Shaban Osman, is an Egyptian footballer who plays as a midfielder. He plays for ENPPI Club and the Egyptian U-23 national team.

International career
Afroto was a part of the Egypt U-20 national team squad which participated in the 2009 FIFA U-20 World Cup played on home soil.

References

1989 births
Living people
Egyptian footballers
Egypt international footballers
Association football midfielders
Al Ahly SC players
Al Masry SC players
Petrojet SC players
ENPPI SC players
Egyptian Premier League players